Locke: Live at Club Moscow was filmed live on August 21, 2016 when Locke took the stage of "Club Moscow" at Los Angeles' legendary Boardner's by La Belle.  This was the final show of the "Blue Heart" era promoting his debut EP of the same title.  The setlist includes a special performance of Jimi Hendrix's "Purple Haze."  In addition to his backing band The Keys (Nick Jordan and Daniel Rudd) this concert features guest appearances from vocalist Kaleena Zanders and guitarist Travis Lee Stephenson.  The film can be seen on YouTube.

Setlist 
 "#ThisCouldBeUs"
 "Give It Up"
 "Style On Fleek"
 "Rendezvous"
 "Trojans"
 "Purple Haze"
 "KING"

Personnel

Main 
 Directed by Doug Locke
 Producer: Julien Lasseur
 Producer: Jamie Thalman
 Editor: Alexander Jellvi
 Production Designer: Doug Locke
 Camera Operator: Tobias Levene 
 Production Assistant: Bernice Fonge
 Production Assistant: Elizabeth Ramirez
 Lighting Design  Scoti
 Live Sound Mix: Matt Lowry
 Sound Mix and Master: Eric Lee McNeely
 Colorist: Patrick Maxwell

Band 
 Guitar: Daniel Rudd
 Drums: Nick Jordan
 Guest Vocalist: Kaleena Zanders
 Guest Guitar: Travis Stephenson

References 

Concert films